Turkozelotes is a genus of ground spiders that was first described by M. M. Kovblyuk in 2009.  it contains only three species: T. mccowani, T. microb, and T. mirandus.

References

Araneomorphae genera
Gnaphosidae
Spiders of Asia